A futermelok is a type of pryanik with glace from Upper Silesia. It is usually diced and sold on the markets during fetes and parish festivals.

Etymology 
The world futermelok (plural: futermeloki) is used in Polish and comes from the German words Futter 'food, fodder' and Mehl 'flour'.

References 

Silesian cuisine
Baked goods
Desserts
Confectionery